The 2006 Atlanta Braves season was the Braves' 136th for the franchise and 41st in Atlanta. During the season, the Braves attempted to win the NL East.

Finishing with a 79–83 record, not only did the Braves miss the playoffs for the first time since 1990, but also their first losing season that same season. In failing to reach the postseason, Atlanta ended their streak of fourteen consecutive division titles.

Regular season

Season standings

National League East

Record vs. opponents

Transactions
December 8, 2005: Édgar Rentería was traded by the Boston Red Sox with cash to the Atlanta Braves for Andy Marte.
July 20, 2006: Bob Wickman was traded by the Cleveland Indians to the Atlanta Braves for Max Ramirez (minors).

Roster

Player stats

Batting

Starters by position
Note: Pos = Position; G = Games played; AB = At bats; H = Hits; Avg. = Batting average; HR = Home runs; RBI = Runs batted in

Other batters
Note: G = Games played; AB = At bats; H = Hits; Avg. = Batting average; HR = Home runs; RBI = Runs batted in

Pitching

Starting pitchers
Note: G = Games pitched; IP = Innings pitched; W = Wins; L = Losses; ERA = Earned run average; SO = Strikeouts

Other pitchers
Note: G = Games pitched; IP = Innings pitched; W = Wins; L = Losses; ERA = Earned run average; SO = Strikeouts

Relief pitchers
Note: G = Games pitched; W = Wins; L = Losses; SV = Saves; ERA = Earned run average; SO = Strikeouts

Farm system

LEAGUE CHAMPIONS: Danville

References

2006 Atlanta Braves season at Baseball Reference
Game Logs:
1st Half: Atlanta Braves Game Log on ESPN.com
2nd Half: Atlanta Braves Game Log on ESPN.com
Batting Statistics: Atlanta Braves Batting Stats on ESPN.com
Pitching Statistics: Atlanta Braves Pitching Stats on ESPN.com

Atlanta Braves
Atlanta Braves seasons
Atlanta